Santee Boulders is a rock outcropping and recreational rock climbing area in the northern section of Santee, California.

It is well known for its thin faces and mantels. However, it also has challenging cracks and steep face climbs.

The boulders at Santee have been climbed for decades, even though the boulders themselves are located on private land. The Access Fund has been able to work with the owners in keeping this popular bouldering site open to the public. Some common routes are Moby Dick and Pride Rock (located on the North Eastern section of the trail), as well as Amphitheater and Watering Hole (located North of the trailhead).

Gallery

External links 
Rockclimbing.com: Santee Boulders
The Access Fund Website

Rock formations of California
Landforms of San Diego County, California
Santee, California
Climbing areas of California